Eucosmophora paraguayensis is a moth of the family Gracillariidae. It is known from Paraguay.

The length of the forewings is 3.0–3.7 mm for males.

The larvae probably feed on a Sapotaceae species and probably mine the leaves of their host plant.

Etymology
The specific name refers to the origin of the type series, Paraguay, and the Latin suffix -ensis, denoting place, locality.

References

Acrocercopinae
Moths described in 2005